Leogang is a municipality in the district of Zell am See (Pinzgau region), in the state of Salzburg in Austria. It is a famous winter sports and summer mountain hiking resort.

Population

Sights
Mining and Gothic Museum
tourist mine Schwarzleo

Gallery

References

Cities and towns in Zell am See District
Ski areas and resorts in Austria